George Spencer-Churchill may refer to:

George Spencer-Churchill, 5th Duke of Marlborough (1766–1840)
George Spencer-Churchill, 6th Duke of Marlborough (1793–1857)
George Spencer-Churchill, 8th Duke of Marlborough (1844–1892)
George Spencer-Churchill, Marquess of Blandford (born 1992), elder son of Charles, 12th Duke of Marlborough, oldest surviving son of John, 11th Duke of Marlborough

See also
George Spencer (disambiguation)
George Churchill (disambiguation)